Olivia Jo Thirlby (born October 6, 1986) is an American actress. She is known for her roles as Leah in the comedy-drama film Juno (2007), as Natalie in The Darkest Hour (2011) and as Judge Cassandra Anderson in Dredd (2012).

Early life
Thirlby was born on October 6, 1986, in New York City, to an advertising executive mother and a contractor father. She was raised in Manhattan's East Village, attending school at Friends Seminary in the city's Gramercy neighborhood, where she graduated in a class of 57 students. She also attended French Woods Festival of the Performing Arts in upstate New York, and Usdan Center for the Creative and Performing Arts (the Long Island summer arts camp also attended by Natalie Portman and Mariah Carey). She took classes at the American Globe Theatre, and briefly at the Royal Academy of Dramatic Art in London where she completed a stage combat course with the British Academy of Stage and Screen Combat (BASSC).

Career
While still in high school, Thirlby was offered a role in The Secret. In 2006, she made her film debut in United 93 and her television debut in Kidnapped.

In 2007, she played Leah in Juno. Around this time, she and her Juno co-star Elliot Page were slated to star as the respective title characters of Jack & Diane as two young women who fall in love which unlocked lycanthropy in one character but both dropped out before production, and the cast was replaced numerous times over. She plays Stephanie, a marijuana-smoking "popular girl" from New York City, in Sundance Audience Award-winning mid-1990s period piece film The Wackness, which was released in the U.S. on July 3, 2008, and stars opposite Josh Peck.
Thirlby was cast in the Judd Apatow-produced, David Gordon Green-directed stoner comedy Pineapple Express as the girlfriend of Seth Rogen's character, but was replaced by Amber Heard after rehearsing for the film. She reunited with David Gordon Green on the animated TV pilot Good Vibes.

She made her stage debut in Farragut North, a play by Beau Willimon at the Atlantic Theater Company in New York City. The Off-Broadway production ran from October 22, 2008 – November 29, 2008 with official opening on November 12 and transferred to the Geffen Playhouse in June 2009.

Thirlby appeared in the 2009 HBO series Bored to Death. She voices promotional video excerpts from the novel Thirteen Reasons Why by Jay Asher which, since October 2008, have regularly been posted to YouTube. She also appeared in the 2011-released film Margaret. She was attached to star in Christmas in New York, though the film was not made, as well as For Ellen, where it appears she did not accept a role.

Thirlby starred in the Russian science-fiction film The Darkest Hour, released in 2011, directed by Chris Gorak, and produced by Timur Bekmambetov.

Thirlby starred as Judge Cassandra Anderson in the 2012 film adaptation of Judge Dredd, with Karl Urban in the title role. She next starred in the indie film Nobody Walks co-starring John Krasinski and Rosemarie DeWitt. She plays Martine, a young artist taken in a couple's home. It premiered at 2012 Sundance Film Festival. In 2016, Thirlby co-starred as the young attorney Lucy Kittridge in the Amazon Studios legal series Goliath. 2017 saw her play a main character in the thriller Damascus Cover. In 2018 she took the lead in The White Orchid. She also portrayed the main character in 2019's Above the Shadows. Thirlby featured as MCC minister Rebecca Dowery in the 2019 Showtime drama series The L Word: Generation Q. She was Hero Brown, a main character in 2021's Y: The Last Man.

Personal life
Thirlby is a participant in iO Tillett Wright's Self-Evident Truths Project. In an interview with Brooklyn Magazine in 2011, Thirlby publicly came out as bisexual and stated why she decided to be a part of a photography project that focuses on people who are "anything but 100 percent straight."

She has been married to Jacques Pienaar since December 28, 2014; she met him on the set of her 2012 film Dredd.

Filmography

Film

Television

Theater

References

External links

 
 

Actresses from New York City
American film actresses
American stage actresses
American television actresses
Bisexual actresses
Jewish American actresses
Living people
People from the East Village, Manhattan
21st-century American actresses
LGBT people from New York (state)
Friends Seminary alumni
Alumni of RADA
Bisexual Jews
21st-century American Jews
1986 births
American bisexual actors